Nonyma is a genus of longhorn beetles of the subfamily Lamiinae, containing the following species:

subgenus Myonomoides
 Nonyma allardi Breuning, 1972
 Nonyma grisescens Breuning, 1969
 Nonyma mirei Breuning, 1977
 Nonyma strandiella Breuning, 1940

subgenus Nonyma
 Nonyma apicespinosa Breuning, 1940
 Nonyma bergeri Breuning, 1975
 Nonyma congoensis (Breuning, 1948)
 Nonyma egregia Pascoe, 1864
 Nonyma glabricollis Breuning, 1969
 Nonyma glabrifrons Kolbe, 1894
 Nonyma insularis Báguena & Breuning, 1958
 Nonyma leleupi Breuning, 1956
 Nonyma lepesmei Breuning, 1957
 Nonyma mediofusca Breuning, 1940
 Nonyma nigeriae Breuning, 1978
 Nonyma strigata (Pascoe, 1864)
 Nonyma subinermicollis Breuning, 1981
 Nonyma uluguruensis Breuning, 1975
 Nonyma unicolor Breuning, 1961
 Nonyma variegata Breuning, 1940

References

 
Desmiphorini